The Order of Stjepan Radić is a Croatian national decoration which ranks thirteenth in importance. The order was formed on 1 April 1995.

The Order of Stjepan Radić is granted to Croatians and foreigners for services and sacrifices for the national and social rights of the Croatian people. It is named after Stjepan Radić.

Recipients 

 Rudolf Perešin
 Ruža Tomašić
 Franjo Tuđman

References

Sources
 Law of decorations and recognitions of the Republic of Croatia ("Narodne novine", no. 20/95., 57/06. i 141/06.) - articles 6 and  17
 Statute of Order of Stjepan Radić ("Narodne novine", no. 108/00. from November 3, 2000).

Stjepan Radic
1995 establishments in Croatia
Awards established in 1995